Cardel Homes is a homebuilder based in Calgary, Alberta, Canada. Cardel was founded in 1973 and has since grown into Calgary's largest homebuilder, with additional operations in Ottawa, Tampa and Denver.

Brands 

Several brands exist under the Cardel parent brand. Cardel's homebuilding divisions include Cardel Lifestyles, which specializes in multi-family homes, and Cardel Resorts, which builds resort properties in the Columbia Valley, in addition to the company's single-family homes division.

Cardel also operates a mortgage services division called Cardel Financial as well as a design division, Cardel Designs, which is based out of an  design center in head office, located in Quarry Park, southeast Calgary. The Cardel head office is also home to a design kitchen that regularly hosts dinners for customers.

Additional design center are located in Cardel's Ottawa, Denver and Tampa regional offices.

Companies based in Calgary
Construction and civil engineering companies established in 1973
1973 establishments in Alberta